Pseudomonas alcaliphila is a psychrophilic, alkaliphilic, Gram-negative, aerobic straight rod bacterium with polar flagella isolated from sea water near Hokkaidō, Japan.

References

External links
Type strain of Pseudomonas alcaliphila at BacDive -  the Bacterial Diversity Metadatabase

Pseudomonadales
Bacteria described in 2001